Risoba diphtheropsis is a species of moth of the family Nolidae first described by Alice Ellen Prout in 1924. It is found in New Guinea.

References

External links
Original description: Prout, A. E. (1924). "Some Apparently New Noctuidae from Sumatra, New Guinea, Mefor and Buru". Bulletin of the Hill Museum. 1: 431.

Nolidae
Moths of New Guinea
Moths described in 1924